Mike McCallum (born 7 December 1956) is a Jamaican former professional boxer who competed from 1981 to 1997. He held world championships in three weight classes, including the WBA super welterweight title from 1984 to 1988, the WBA middleweight title from 1989 to 1991, and the WBC light heavyweight title from 1994 to 1995.

A slick, hard-hitting technician in the ring, McCallum was known for his exceptionally durable chin and toughness, and was never stopped in any of his five losses. He earned his nickname of "The Bodysnatcher" due to his ability to land vicious body punches in fights. McCallum was inducted into the International Boxing Hall of Fame in 2003. In 2011, The Ring magazine ranked him as eighth on their list of the "10 best middleweight title holders of the last 50 years."

Amateur career
Claimed an amateur record of 240–10
1974 - Competed as a welterweight in the World Championships in Havana, losing by a 3rd-round TKO to Clint Jackson of the United States.
1974 - Won welterweight silver medal at the 1974 Central American and Caribbean Games.
1975 - Represented Jamaica at the 1975 Pan American Games in Mexico City.
1976 - Represented Jamaica as a welterweight at Montreal Olympic Games. Results were:
Defeated Damdinjavyn Bandi (Mongolia) points
Defeated Robert Dauer (Australia) points
Lost to Reinhard Skricek (West Germany) points
1977 - National AAU Welterweight Champion, defeating Marlon Starling in semifinals and Roger Leonard of the Air Force in the final.
1977 - National Golden Gloves Welterweight Champion
1978 - Won welterweight gold medal at the 1978 Central American and Caribbean Games.
1978 - Welterweight Gold Medalist at Commonwealth Games in Edmonton, Canada.
1978 - Won welterweight gold medal at the 1978 Central American and Caribbean Games.
1979 - National Golden Gloves Welterweight Champion, defeating Doug DeWitt and Robbie Sims.
1979 - Welterweight Silver Medalist at Pan-American Games in San Juan, Puerto Rico. Results were:
Defeated Claudio Pereira (Brazil)
Defeated Edward Green (United States) TKO 2
Defeated Javier Colin (Mexico) TKO
Lost to Andrés Aldama (Cuba) KO by 2
1979 - National Golden Gloves Welterweight Champion.
1980 - Lost to Alex Ramos in New York Golden Gloves.

Professional career

Light middleweight
Mike McCallum turned professional in 1981. As a professional, he fought almost exclusively in the USA. He first became a world champion in 1984 by defeating Sean Mannion to win the vacant WBA super welterweight title. McCallum would defend that title six times, winning all six fights by knock out.

His first prominent opponent was future two-weight world champion and future fellow International Boxing Hall of Fame member Julian Jackson, whom McCallum fought in his third title defense. McCallum survived some punishment in the first round and came back to stop the undefeated Jackson in the second round.

McCallum really came to prominence when he knocked out former WBC welterweight title-holder Milton McCrory and former undisputed world welterweight champion, another future International Boxing Hall of Fame member, Donald Curry in 1987. Curry was ahead on all three scorecards going into the fifth round when McCallum knocked him out with what some have called a "perfect" left hook.

Middleweight
In 1988, he moved up to middleweight, suffering his first defeat, a clear unanimous decision, in an attempt to win the WBA middleweight championship from Sumbu Kalambay. In 1989, McCallum defeated Herol Graham by a split decision to win the then-vacant WBA middleweight title (which had been stripped from Kalambay for signing to face IBF champion Michael Nunn). He defended the title three times, defeating Steve Collins, Michael Watson, and Kalambay in a rematch.

McCallum fought IBF middleweight champion James Toney in 1991. McCallum was stripped of the WBA title before the bout. The fight ended in a draw, and McCallum lost the second fight by a controversial majority decision the following year. Some felt that McCallum won both fights.

Light heavyweight
McCallum then moved up two weight divisions and won the WBC interim light heavyweight title against Randall Yonker, then won the full WBC title by outpointing Jeff Harding in 1994. Being in his late thirties, he did not hold the crown long, losing the title to Fabrice Tiozzo. At 40 years of age, he attempted to regain the vacant Interim WBC title against Roy Jones Jr. in December 1996, but lost by a wide decision.

In his last fight, McCallum lost a rubber match to James Toney via a unanimous decision in a cruiserweight bout.

McCallum had a professional record of 49-5-1 (36 knockouts). He was never knocked out as a professional. After McCallum retired, he moved to Las Vegas and became a trainer. He was inducted into the International Boxing Hall of Fame in 2003.

Professional boxing record

See also
List of boxing triple champions
List of world light-middleweight boxing champions
List of world middleweight boxing champions
List of world light-heavyweight boxing champions

References

External links

|-

|-

1956 births
Living people
Jamaican male boxers
Sportspeople from Kingston, Jamaica
International Boxing Hall of Fame inductees
Boxers at the 1975 Pan American Games
Boxers at the 1976 Summer Olympics
Olympic boxers of Jamaica
Competitors at the 1974 Central American and Caribbean Games
Competitors at the 1978 Central American and Caribbean Games
Central American and Caribbean Games medalists in boxing
Central American and Caribbean Games gold medalists for Jamaica
Central American and Caribbean Games silver medalists for Jamaica
Boxers at the 1979 Pan American Games
Pan American Games medalists in boxing
Medalists at the 1979 Pan American Games
Pan American Games silver medalists for Jamaica
Boxers at the 1978 Commonwealth Games
Medallists at the 1978 Commonwealth Games
Commonwealth Games gold medallists for Jamaica
Commonwealth Games medallists in boxing
Winners of the United States Championship for amateur boxers
National Golden Gloves champions
World light-middleweight boxing champions
World middleweight boxing champions
World light-heavyweight boxing champions
World Boxing Association champions
World Boxing Council champions